Sinomenium is a genus of plant in family Menispermaceae first described as a genus in 1910. It contains only one known species, Sinomenium acutum, native to China, northern India, Nepal, Japan, northern Thailand, and also Korea.

Fossil record
Sinomenium macrofossils have been recovered from the late Zanclean stage of Pliocene sites in Pocapaglia, Italy. Macrofossils of Sinomenium cantalense have been recovered from the Zanclean stage of the Pliocene epoch in Western Georgia in the Caucasus region.

References

Menispermaceae
Menispermaceae genera
Monotypic Ranunculales genera
Flora of China
Flora of India (region)
Flora of Japan
Flora of Nepal
Flora of Thailand